LeFrak-Moelis Records (or LMR for short) was a New York City-based record label founded by Samuel J. LeFrak of the LeFrak Organization and music industry veteran Herb Moelis. They had initial success in the late 1980s and early 1990s with Miami-based freestyle artist Stevie B. Other artists that LMR had in its roster included Maestro Fresh Wes, Daisy Dee and Jaya.

Its successor, Saja Records, holds the rights to Jim Croce's ABC-Dunhill releases and Stevie B's recordings before he signed with Empire Musicwerks during the mid-2000s.

Originally an independent label, LMR was later distributed by RCA Records. The label is currently distributed by Atlantic Records.

See also
 List of record labels

American record labels